Rick Prelinger is an American archivist, writer, and filmmaker. A professor at the University of California, Santa Cruz, Prelinger is best known as the founder of the Prelinger Archives, a collection of 60,000 advertising, educational, industrial, and amateur films acquired by the Library of Congress in 2002 after 20 years' operation.

Rick has partnered with the Internet Archive to make over 6,000 films from Prelinger Archives available online for free viewing, downloading and reuse. With the Voyager Company, a pioneer new media publisher, he produced fourteen LaserDiscs and CD-ROMs with material from his archives, including Ephemeral Films, the Our Secret Century series and Call It Home: The House That Private Enterprise Built, a laserdisc on the history of suburbia and suburban planning (co-produced with architect Keller Easterling). For Prelinger, "archives are a primary weapon against amnesia."

Life
Prelinger worked at The Comedy Channel from its startup in 1989 until it merged with the comedy network HA! to become Comedy Central. He then worked at Home Box Office until 1995. Prelinger has taught in the MFA design program at New York's School of Visual Arts and lectures widely on American cultural and social history and on issues of cultural and intellectual property access. He sat (2001–2004) on the National Film Preservation Board as representative of the Association of Moving Image Archivists, was Board President of the San Francisco Cinematheque (2002–2007), and is a board member of the Internet Archive and a professor in the Department of Film & Digital Media at UC Santa Cruz.

His feature-length film Panorama Ephemera opened in summer 2004. With spouse Megan Prelinger he is co-founder of the Prelinger Library, a reference library located in San Francisco, California. He has produced such archival compilation films Lost Landscapes of San Francisco (15 annual films, 2006–2020) and Lost Landscapes of Detroit (three films, 2010–2012 and a fourth and fifth, "Yesterday and Tomorrow in Detroit", 2014 and 2015.) He received the Creative Capital Award in 2012 to make the film No More Road Trips?, which premiered in Austin, Texas, at South by Southwest in March 2013.

He wrote The Field Guide to Sponsored Films (2007) which "describes 452 historically or culturally significant motion pictures commissioned by businesses, charities, advocacy groups, and state or local government units between 1897 and 1980." It is available as a book and as a free PDF from the National Film Preservation Foundation. He worked at the Internet Archive on a texts-digitization project and helped organize the Open Content Alliance.

See also
Sponsored film

References

External links

Interview/podcast on the future of archives and issues relating to access to archives and culture (2011)
Interview with Spots Unknown
Prelinger.com
blackoystercatcher, Rick Prelinger's blog
Prelinger Collection
Prelinger Library
Panorama Ephemera
Panorama Ephemera published in the Vectors Journal of Culture and Technology in a Dynamic Vernacular, Volume 2 Issue 1 (Ephemera).
The Field Guide to Sponsored Films
Prelinger's "Reimagining the Archive" presentation at UCLA, November 2010
Lost Landscapes of Detroit, 2010 at Internet Archive

1953 births
Living people
American archivists
American film directors
University of California, Santa Cruz faculty
American male writers
Internet Archive collectors